Samuel Michael Lindsay Meeking (12 January 1903 – 16 May 1960) was an Australian rules footballer who played with North Melbourne in the Victorian Football League (VFL).

Death
He died (suddenly) at his residence in Balwyn, Victoria on 16 May 1960.

Notes

External links 

Lindsay Meeking's playing statistics from The VFA Project

1903 births
1960 deaths
Australian rules footballers from Victoria (Australia)
North Melbourne Football Club (VFA) players
North Melbourne Football Club players